The 1951 Fordham Rams football team represented Fordham University as an independent during the 1951 college football season. In their sixth year under head coach Ed Danowski, the Rams compiled a 5–4 record. Chris Campbell was the team captain. The Rams were outscored 232 to 183. 

Fordham played two games at Triborough Stadium on Randalls Island in Manhattan, New York City, and the rest of its schedule on the road.

Schedule

References

Fordham
Fordham Rams football seasons
Fordham Rams football